Ralph Ignatius Thomas Alles (3 October 1932 − 28 November 2013) was a Sri Lankan educationalist. He served as the State Secretary for Ministry of Education from 1989 to 1993, was the founding principal and creator of D. S. Senanayake College Colombo 07, and was the founder of the Gateway Group and acted as its chairman until his death.

Alles was educated at St. Aloysius' College, Galle and later at St. Anthony's College.

He started his career as a teacher, eventually becoming an assistant principal at Royal College Colombo in Colombo, a leading public school in Sri Lanka, and helped to establish D. S. Senanayake College, Colombo. In 25 years at the school, he was a Director of Studies at Zahira College, Colombo in Sri Lanka. There after he established the Gateway International School.

References

External links 
R I T Alles
Ralph Alles: All for the children

1932 births
2013 deaths
Sri Lankan educational theorists
Sinhalese educators
Sinhalese teachers
Alumni of St. Aloysius' College, Galle
Faculty of Royal College, Colombo
People from Galle
Alumni of St. Anthony's College, Kandy
Sri Lanka Sikhamani